Middleton Railway station served the town of Middleton. Opened on 5 January 1857 it was at the end of short branch from Middleton Junction railway station. It closed to passengers on 7 September 1964 and completely on 11 October 1965.

References

Disused railway stations in the Metropolitan Borough of Rochdale
Former Lancashire and Yorkshire Railway stations
Railway stations in Great Britain opened in 1857
Railway stations in Great Britain closed in 1964
Beeching closures in England
Middleton, Greater Manchester
1857 establishments in England